A red envelope or red packet is a monetary gift given during holidays or for special occasions such as a wedding, a graduation, or the birth of a baby. Although the red envelope is from Chinese traditions, other cultures also share similar traditional customs. The red packet is also called "money warding off old age" for Chinese New Year.

These customs have also been adopted across parts of Southeast Asia, and other countries that have a sizable ethnic Chinese population as well. In the mid-2010s, a digital equivalent to the practice emerged within messaging apps with mobile wallet systems localised for Chinese New Year.

Usage
Red envelopes, more commonly known as Hong Bao (in  Mandarin) or Lai See (in Cantonese), are gifts presented at social and family gatherings such as weddings or holidays such as Chinese New Year. The red color of the envelope symbolizes good luck and is a symbol to ward off evil spirits. It is also gifted when a person is visiting as a gesture of kindness for visiting. Red envelopes are usually given out to the younger generation who are normally still in school or unmarried.

The amount of money contained in the envelope usually ends with an even digit, in accordance with Chinese beliefs; odd-numbered money gifts are traditionally associated with funerals. An exception exists for the number nine, as the pronunciation of nine is homophonous to the word long, and is the largest single digit. Still in some regions of China and in its diaspora community, odd numbers are favored for weddings because they are difficult to divide. There is also a widespread tradition that money should not be given in fours, or the number four should not appear in the amount, such as in 40, 400, and 444, as the pronunciation of the word four is similar to the word death. When giving money, new crispy bills are normally given instead of old dirty bills. It is common to see long queues outside of banks before Chinese New Year with people waiting to get new bills.

At wedding banquets, the amount offered is usually intended to cover the cost of the attendees as well as signify goodwill to the newlyweds. Amounts given are often recorded in ceremonial ledgers for the new couple to keep.

During the Chinese New Year, in Southern China, red envelopes are typically given by the married to the unmarried, most of whom are children. In northern and southern China, red envelopes are typically given by the elders to the younger under 25 (30 in most of the three northeastern provinces), regardless of marital status. The amount of money is usually notes to avoid heavy coins and to make it difficult to judge the amount inside before opening. In Malaysia it is common to add a coin to the notes, particularly in hong baos given to children, signifying even more luck.

It is traditional to put brand-new notes inside red envelopes and to avoid opening the envelopes in front of the relatives out of courtesy. However, to get the money, the younger generation needs to kowtow to thank their elders.

It is also given during the Chinese New Year in workplace from a person of authority (supervisors or owner of the business) out of his own fund to employees as a token of good fortune for the upcoming year.

In Suzhou, the children kept the red envelope in their bedroom after they received. They believed that putting the red envelope under their bed can protect the children. The action how they holding down the red envelope refer to the Chinese meaning . Those  would not be used until the end of Chinese New Year. They also received fruit or cake during the new year.

In acting, it is also conventional to give an actor a red packet when he or she is to play a dead character, or pose for a picture for an obituary or a grave stone.

Red packets are also used to deliver payment for favorable service to lion dance performers, religious practitioners, teachers, and doctors.

Red packets as a form of bribery in China's film industry were revealed in 2014's Sony hack.

Virtual red envelopes
A contemporary interpretation of the practice comes in the form of virtual red envelopes, implemented as part of mobile payment platforms. During the Chinese New Year holiday in 2014, the messaging app WeChat introduced the ability to distribute virtual red envelopes of money to contacts and groups via its WeChat Pay platform. The launch included an on-air promotion during the [[CCTV New Year's Gala] — China's most-watched television special — where viewers could win red envelopes as prizes.

Adoption of WeChat Pay saw a major increase following the launch, and two years later, over 32 billion virtual envelopes were sent over the Chinese New Year holiday in 2016 (itself a tenfold increase over 2015). The popularity of the feature spawned imitations from other vendors; a "red envelope war" emerged between WeChat owner Tencent and its historic rival, Alibaba Group, who added a similar function to its competing messaging service and has held similar giveaway promotions. Analysts estimated that over 100 billion digital red envelopes would be sent over the New Year holiday in 2017. A research study shows that this popularization of virtual red packets comes from their contagious feature—users who receive red packets feel obligated to follow suit to send another one.

Origin

Some say that the history of the red packet dates back to Han Dynasty (202 BC – 220 AD). It is not real money, but a real blessing item. It was believed to protect people from sickness and death.

In the Tang Dynasty, the Chinese New Year was considered to be the beginning of spring, and in addition to congratulations, elders gave money to children to ward off evil spirits.

After the Song and Yuan Dynasties, the custom of giving money in the Spring Festival evolved into the custom of giving children lucky money. The elderly would thread coins with a red string.

In the Ming and Qing Dynasties, there were two kinds of lucky money. One was made of red string and coins, sometimes placed at the foot of the bed in the shape of a dragon. The other is a colourful pouch filled with coins.

In Qing dynasty, the name  came up. The book  recorded that "elders give children coins threaded together by a red string, the money is called ."

From the Republic of China (1912–1949) era, it evolved into a hundred coins wrapped in red paper, meaning "May you live a hundred years!". Due to the lack of holes in modern-day coins, the use of red envelopes became more prevalent—because one could no longer thread the coins with string. Later on, people adopted banknotes instead of coins in red envelopes.

After the founding of the People's Republic of China in 1949, the custom of the elders giving the younger generation money continued.

Other customs
Other similar traditions also exist in other countries in Asia.

Ethnic Chinese
In Thailand, Myanmar (Burma), and Cambodia, the Chinese diaspora and immigrants have introduced the culture of red envelopes.

Cambodia
In Cambodia, red envelopes are called ang pav or tae ea ("give ang pav"). Ang pav are delivered with best wishes from elder to younger generations. The money amount in ang pav makes young children happy and is a most important gift which traditionally reflects the best wishes as a symbol of good luck for the elders. Ang pav can be presented on the day of Chinese New Year or Saen Chen, when relatives gather together. The gift is kept as a worship item in or under the pillowcase, or somewhere else, especially near the bed of young while they are sleeping in New Year time. Gift in ang pav can be either money or a cheque, and more or less according to the charity of the donors.

The tradition of the delivery of ang pav traditionally descended from one generation to another a long time ago. Ang pav will not be given to some one in family who has got a career, but this person has to, in return, deliver it to their parents and/or their younger children or siblings.

At weddings, the amount offered is usually intended to cover the cost of the attendees as well as help the newly married couple.

Vietnam

In Vietnam, red envelopes are a traditional part of Vietnamese culture considered to be lucky money and are typically given to children during Vietnamese Lunar New Year. They are generally given by the elders and adults, where a greeting or offering health and longevity is exchanged by the younger generation. Common greetings include "", "", "" and "", which all relate back to the idea of wishing health and prosperity as age besets everyone in Vietnam on the Lunar New Year. The typical name for lucky money is lì xì or, less commonly, .

South Korea
In South Korea, a monetary gift is given to children by their relatives during the New Year period. However, lucky bags ("bokjumeoni 복주머니" in Korean) are used.

Japan
A monetary gift otoshidama is given to children by their relatives during the New Year period. White or decorated envelopes (otoshidama-bukuro) are used instead of red, with the name of the receiver usually written on the front side. A similar practice, shūgi-bukuro, is observed for Japanese weddings, but the envelope is folded rather than sealed, and decorated with an elaborate bow, called mizuhiki.

Philippines
In the Philippines, Chinese Filipinos exchange red envelopes (termed ang pao) during the Lunar New Year, which is an easily recognisable symbol. The red envelope has gained wider acceptance among non-Chinese Filipinos, who have appropriated the custom for other occasions such as birthdays, and in giving monetary aguinaldo during Christmas.

Green envelope

Malay Muslims in Malaysia, Brunei, Indonesia, and Singapore have adopted the Chinese custom of handing out monetary gifts in envelopes as part of their Eid al-Fitr (Malay: Hari Raya Aidilfitri) celebrations, but instead of red packets, any other coloured envelopes are used, most commonly green. Customarily a family will have (usually small) amounts of money in green envelopes ready for visitors, and may send them to friends and family unable to visit. Green is used for its traditional association with Islam, and the adaptation of the red envelope is based on the Muslim custom of sadaqah, or voluntary charity. While present in the Qur'an, sadaqah is much less formally established than the sometimes similar practice of zakat, and in many cultures this takes a form closer to gift-giving and generosity among friends than charity in the strict sense, i.e. no attempt is made to give more to guests "in need", nor is it as a religious obligation as Islamic charity is often viewed. Among the Sundanese people, a boy who had been recently circumcised is given monetary gifts known as panyecep or uang sunatan in the national language of Indonesia.

Purple envelope
The tradition of ang pao has also been adopted by the local Indian Hindu populations of Singapore and Malaysia for Deepavali. They are known as Deepavali ang pow (in Malaysia), purple ang pow or simply ang pow (in Singapore). Yellow coloured envelopes for Deepavali have also been available at times in the past.

See also
 Chinese marriage
 Chinese social relations
 Color in Chinese culture
 Eidi, Islamic
 Hell money

References

Sources
 Chengan Sun, "Les enveloppes rouges : évolution et permanence des thèmes d'une image populaire chinoise" [Red envelopes : evolution and permanence of the themes of a Chinese popular image], PhD, Paris, 2011.
 Chengan Sun, Les enveloppes rouges (Le Moulin de l'Etoile, 2011) .
 Helen Wang, "Cultural Revolution Style Red Packets", Chinese Money Matters, 15 May 2018.

External links

 How to Give Lai See in Hong Kong
 Red Packet: Sign of Prosperity
 Gallery: Chinese New Year Red Envelopes
 Will The Paper Red Packet Be Replaced By An Electronic Red Envelope?
 A red envelope with a collection of value-Lai See
 Money envelopes in the British Museum Collection

Chinese culture
Chinese inventions
Chinese-Malaysian culture
Envelopes
Giving
Indian-Malaysian culture
Indonesian culture
Japanese culture
Korean culture
Luck
Malay culture
Malaysian culture
Paper products
Singaporean culture
Vietnamese culture
Wedding gifts